A meat tenderizer, or meat pounder is a hand-powered tool used to tenderize slabs of meat in the preparation for cooking. Although a meat tenderizer can be made out of virtually any object, there are three types manufactured specifically for tenderizing meat.
 The first, most common, is a tool that resembles a hammer or mallet made of metal or wood with a short handle and dual heads. One face of the tool is usually flat while the other has rows of pyramid-shaped tenderizers.
 The second form resembles a potato masher with a short handle and a large metal face that is either smooth or adorned with the same pyramid-shaped tenderizers as found in the first form.
 The third form is a blade tenderizer that has a series of blades or nails that are designed to puncture the meat and cut into the fibers of the muscle.

Tenderizing meat with the mallet softens the fibers, making the meat easier to chew and to digest.  It is useful when preparing particularly tough cuts of steak, and works well when broiling or frying the meat.  It is also used to "pound out" dishes such as chicken-fried steak, palomilla, and schnitzel, to make them wider and thinner.

See also
 Cooking
 Meat tenderness

References

Food preparation utensils